Holzgau is a municipality in the district of Reutte in the Austrian state of Tyrol.

Climate

References

cities and towns in Reutte District